Massa (1930 – 30 December 1984) was a male gorilla who reached the age of 54 years. At the time, this was the oldest gorilla ever recorded, though later individuals would eventually surpass that record.

Massa was born in the wild in Ghana.  He was shipped to the United States at an early age and his first owner was Brooklyn eccentric Gertrude Lintz. In 1935, after accidentally spilling water on Massa, which startled him severely, Lintz decided to sell him to the Philadelphia Zoo.

In his prime, Massa weighed 400 lbs (181 kg).

Massa lived at the zoo until his death from a stroke on 30 December 1984, following a special birthday party held by the zoo, complete with a special cake and a live dixieland band.  He was buried within the grounds of the zoo.

The 1997 film Buddy was based on the life of Massa (with some elements from the life of another of Lintz's gorillas, Gargantua, who was known at the time as Buddy).

See also
 List of individual apes

References
Milwaukee Public Museum Exhibit: Samson Remembered


Notes

External links
 
 youtube, Massa the Gorilla

1930 animal births
1984 animal deaths
Individual gorillas
Individual primates in the United States